Adelino Santiago Castelo David (born 1955) is a Santomean bank manager and politician.

Biography
David graduated with a doctorate.  He became a bank manager and was later president of Caixa Nacional de Poupanças e Crédito.  In 1992, he became posted as governor of the Central Bank of São Tomé and Príncipe, the post was later taken by Carlos Quaresma Batista da Silva in 1994. Afterwards he worked at the World Bank and work as a consultant to his national government.

On January 5, 1999, he became Minister of Finance and Planning under the Prime Minister Guilherme Posser da Costa up to 26 September 2001.  He was later advisor to the finance minister from 2002 to 2004.

Once more, he became Minister of Finance and Planning under Prime Minister Damião Vaz d’Almeida from 18 September 2004 to 2 June 2005.  Later, he was temporary a consultant to the finance minister.

References

External links
rulers.org
AfDevInfo

1955 births
Living people
São Tomé and Príncipe politicians
Government ministers of São Tomé and Príncipe
Finance ministers
Central bankers